The Linux Kongress was an annual conference of Linux developers from around the world, that took place every year from 1994 to 2010. It started as a two-day conference in 1994, when Linux was in the early stages of development, and by 2003 had become a four-day event. It occurred every year in Germany except 2001 and 2007. During its lifespan, Linux-Kongress was one of the three major international grass-roots Linux and Open Source conferences in the world, along with linux.conf.au and Ottawa Linux Symposium.

The focus of Linux-Kongress was development topics, either in kernel or user space. The conference language was English. By the end, the event consisted of two days of conference preceded by two days of tutorials.

Notable speakers
The conference was a meeting place for many different types of developers. Speakers at the conference included kernel developers like Linus Torvalds, Alan Cox, Theodore Ts'o, Rusty Russell, James Bottomley, user space developers like Kalle Dalheimer and Miguel de Icaza, and open source advocates like Eric S. Raymond and Jon Hall.

History
In 1999 the conference cooperated with the Storage Management Workshop. In 2000 and 2001 there were several multi-day workshops sponsored by the German Ministry of Science and Education that preceded the conference. Also there was collaboration with NLUUG. In 2009 it was co-located with the OpenSolaris Developer Conference OSDevCon.

The conference was organized by the German Unix User Group (GUUG). In 2011, GUUG decided not to hold a Linux Kongress, and instead focus its resources on LinuxCon Europe. There has not been a Linux Kongress since.

External links
Linux Kongress website
About the Linux-Kongress

Linux conferences
Free-software events
Recurring events established in 1994